Timothy Paul Stoddard (born January 24, 1953) is a former Major League Baseball pitcher. He is one of only two men to have played in both a World Series and a Final Four of the NCAA Men's Division I Basketball Championship, along with fellow East Chicago Washington High School alumnus Kenny Lofton.

A right-handed pitcher, Stoddard pitched for the Chicago White Sox (1975), Baltimore Orioles (1978–83), Chicago Cubs (1984), San Diego Padres (1985–86), New York Yankees (1986–88) and Cleveland Indians (1989). Currently, he is the pitching coach for the baseball team at North Central College.

Collegiate Baseball/Basketball career

The 6'7" Stoddard was born in East Chicago, Indiana. He was a member of the 1971 East Chicago Washington High School Senators basketball team, which went undefeated (29-0) and won the Indiana state high school basketball championship.  Among his teammates were Pete Trgovich (who played at UCLA) and Junior Bridgeman (who played at Louisville and in the NBA).

Stoddard attended North Carolina State University where he was a two-sport athlete, playing baseball under Coach Sammy Esposito and basketball under Coach Norm Sloan.

Stoddard pitched collegiately for NC State from 1972-1975. Stoddard was 12-3 in 1974 and ranks 4th on the single-season NC State ERA list with a 1.05 ERA in 1975. The team won three ACC Championships in Stoddard's four seasons.

In basketball, Stoddard was a starting forward on the 1973-74 Wolfpack's NCAA Basketball Champions under Coach Sloan, where he was teammates with Basketball Hall-of-Famer David Thompson. The Wolfpack went 30-1 on the season, the lone loss coming to the Bill Walton-led UCLA Bruins. The Wolfpack gained revenge in the NCAA Tournament and defeated UCLA in the Final Four, ending UCLA's seven-year run as National Champions. Stoddard had 9 points and 9 rebounds in the 80-77 double-overtime semifinal victory. Stoddard had 8 points and 7 rebounds in the 76-64 victory in the Championship Game vs. Marquette University. For his collegiate basketball career, Stoddard averaged 6.3 points and 4.9 rebounds per game, including 5.6 points and 4.8 rebounds in the Championship season.

Professional Baseball career

Chicago White Sox (1975-1977)
In January, Stoddard was drafted by the Chicago White Sox in the 2nd round of the MLB January draft after playing collegiate baseball at North Carolina State. In 1975 he made his professional debut, pitching for the Class AA Knoxville Sox, where he went 3-4, with a 4.23 ERA and 7 Saves. In 1976 he pitched for Knoxville and the Class AAA Iowa Oaks. He first reached the majors with one appearance in 1975.

Baltimore Orioles (1977-1983)
Stoddard signed with the Baltimore Orioles on April 8, 1977, eleven days after his release by the White Sox on March 28. He pitched the 1977 season with the Orioles' Class AA Charlotte O's going 10-7 with a 3.21 ERA and 5 saves. In 1978 Stoddard was promoted to the Class AAA Rochester Red Wings, where he was 7-3 with a 2.61 ERA and 7 saves.

The 1979 Orioles won the American League pennant, before losing to the Pittsburgh Pirates in the World Series, after leading three games to one. In Game Four, Stoddard was the winning pitcher and drove in Billy Smith with an eighth-inning single, becoming the first player to drive in a World Series run in his very first at-bat. (At the time, the World Series only used the designated hitter in even-number years.)

Over the next three years Stoddard shared the closer role with left-hander Tippy Martinez. In  his ERA ballooned to 6.09.

In 1983 Stoddard was a member of the Orioles 1983 World Series champions. Stoddard did not pitch in the World Series, which the Orioles won over the Philadelphia Phillies in five games. Stoddard became the first player to win a championship ring in both an NCAA basketball championship game and a World Series.

Chicago Cubs (1984)
Stoddard was traded from the Orioles to the Oakland Athletics for Wayne Gross on December 9, 1983. He was dealt again during spring training on March 26, 1984 from the Athletics to the Chicago Cubs for Stan Kyles, with minor league outfielder Stan Boderick also sent to Oakland to complete the transaction five days later on March 31. During the 1984 season, Stoddard pitched in 58 games and posted a 10-6 record and seven saves as the Cubs won the National League East title—their first postseason appearance since the 1945 World Series. The Cubs, however, lost to the San Diego Padres in the National League Championship Series. After the season Stoddard signed with the Padres as a free agent. The compensation draft pick that the Cubs received for losing Stoddard in free-agency was later used to draft Rafael Palmeiro.

San Diego Padres (1985-1986)

While pitching for the Padres, on June 18, 1986, Stoddard hit his only career home run in what turned out to be his final Major League at bat. After pitching for the Padres for a year and a half, Stoddard was traded to the New York Yankees on July 9, 1986, for Ed Whitson who had famously fought with Yankees Manager Billy Martin.

New York Yankees (1986-1988)
Stoddard served mainly as a Yankee setup man for closer Dave Righetti. While pitching against the California Angels on September 5, 1987, Stoddard gave up the first-ever "broken bat" home run to Jack Howell. Stoddard was released by the Yankees on August 14, 1988 after posting a 6.38 ERA.

Cleveland Indians (1989)
Stoddard pitched his final season with the Cleveland Indians, pitching in 14 games with a 2.95 ERA before being released on July 12, 1989.

In his career, Stoddard pitched in 485 games, all in relief. He won 41 games against 35 losses, with 79 saves, a 3.95 ERA and 582 strikeouts in  innings pitched. Stoddard is one of only two men to play in both an NCAA Basketball Final Four game, and an MLB World Series.

Media

Stoddard appeared in the 1988 movie Big. Stoddard served as the baseball adviser and portrayed a Dodgers pitcher in the 1993 film Rookie of the Year.

Collegiate Coaching

Stoddard is currently the pitching coach for North Central College in Naperville, Illinois, joining the school in 2016. Stoddard previously served as the pitching coach at Northwestern University for 22 seasons. 19 of his pitchers have become major-league draft selections, including Mike Koplove, J. A. Happ, George Kontos and Luke Farrell.

Honors

Stoddard was inducted into the Chicagoland Sports Hall of Fame.

In 2006, Stoddard was inducted into the Indiana Baseball Hall of Fame.

In 2011, Stoddard was inducted into the Indiana Basketball Hall of Fame.

References

External links

Tim Stoddard at SABR (Baseball BioProject)

1953 births
Living people
American men's basketball players
Baltimore Orioles players
Baseball players from Indiana
Canton-Akron Indians players
Charlotte O's players
Chicago Cubs players
Chicago White Sox players
Cleveland Indians players
Fort Lauderdale Yankees players
Iowa Oaks players
Knoxville Sox players
Major League Baseball pitchers
NC State Wolfpack baseball players
NC State Wolfpack men's basketball players
New York Yankees players
Northwestern Wildcats baseball coaches
Rochester Red Wings players
San Diego Padres players
Sportspeople from East Chicago, Indiana
West Palm Beach Tropics players